Belocaulus is a genus of air-breathing land slugs, terrestrial pulmonate gastropod mollusks in the family Veronicellidae, the leatherleaf slugs.

Species 
 Belocaulus angustipes (Heynemann, 1885)
 Belocaulus willibaldoi Ohlweiler & Gomes, 2009

References

Veronicellidae